Paraprotomocerus allardi is a species of beetle in the family Cerambycidae, and the only species in the genus Paraprotomocerus. It was described by Stephan von Breuning in 1966.

References

Prosopocerini
Beetles described in 1966